Zhao Jingbin (born 18 April 1990) is a Chinese rower. He competed in the men's lightweight coxless four event at the 2016 Summer Olympics.

References

External links
 

1990 births
Living people
Chinese male rowers
Olympic rowers of China
Rowers at the 2016 Summer Olympics
World Rowing Championships medalists for China
Rowers at the 2018 Asian Games
Medalists at the 2018 Asian Games
Asian Games medalists in rowing
Asian Games gold medalists for China
Rowers from Inner Mongolia
People from Tongliao
20th-century Chinese people
21st-century Chinese people